Naraman-e Naqareh Kub (also Romanized as Narāmān-e Naqārh Kūb; also known as Naqāreh Kūb, Narāmān, and Neqāreh Kūb) is a village in Qaleh Shahin Rural District, in the Central District of Sarpol-e Zahab County, Kermanshah Province, Iran. At the 2006 census, its population was 582, in 126 families.

References 

Populated places in Sarpol-e Zahab County